Lucas Vieira de Souza (born 4 July 1990) is a Brazilian professional footballer who plays as a midfielder for Saudi Arabian club Al-Khaleej.

Club career
Born in Santo André, São Paulo, Souza started playing professionally with Paraná Clube. In 2013 he moved to Portugal, being relegated from the Primeira Liga with S.C. Olhanense in his first full season.

Souza joined Parma F.C. in late August 2014, for a reported fee of €700,000. He made his Serie A debut on 5 October, playing the full 90 minutes in a 1–2 home loss against Genoa CFC.

Souza returned to Portugal in late January 2015, being loaned to Moreirense F.C. until the end of the campaign. In the summer, after having cut all ties with the Italian club, he signed a one-year contract with C.D. Tondela also in the Portuguese top division.

On 6 July 2017, Souza joined Cyprus' APOEL FC after one year with AEL Limassol in the same country.

On 5 March 2020, Souza join China League One club Changchun Yatai.  On 8 November 2020, Yatai won the division after beating Chengdu Better City 3-0 on the final matchday in his first season and was promoted back to Chinese Super League. 

On 10 April 2011, Souza joined fellow Chinese Super League club Beijing Guoan on loan.  He returned to Yatai on 29 July 2021 after his loan contract expired.

On 29 July 2022, Souza joined Saudi Arabian club Al-Khaleej on a free transfer.

Career statistics

Honours

Club
Changchun Yatai
 China League One: 2020

References

External links

1990 births
Living people
Footballers from São Paulo (state)
Brazilian footballers
Association football midfielders
Campeonato Brasileiro Série B players
Paraná Clube players
Primeira Liga players
S.C. Olhanense players
Moreirense F.C. players
C.D. Tondela players
Serie A players
Parma Calcio 1913 players
Cypriot First Division players
AEL Limassol players
APOEL FC players
China League One players
Chinese Super League players
Changchun Yatai F.C. players
Beijing Guoan F.C. players
Saudi Professional League players
Khaleej FC players
Brazilian expatriate footballers
Expatriate footballers in Portugal
Expatriate footballers in Italy
Expatriate footballers in Cyprus
Expatriate footballers in China
Expatriate footballers in Saudi Arabia
Brazilian expatriate sportspeople in China
Brazilian expatriate sportspeople in Portugal
Brazilian expatriate sportspeople in Cyprus
Brazilian expatriate sportspeople in Saudi Arabia